The 2005 Christy Ring Cup was the inaugural staging of the Christy Ring Cup, the Gaelic Athletic Association's second-tier hurling championship. Competing teams, from Connacht, Leinster, Munster and Ulster were divided into two groups of five, in which teams played each other only once, meaning two home games and two away games per team. The top two teams of each group qualified for the knock-out stages.

On 14 August 2005, Westmeath won the Christy Ring Cup following a 1-23 to 2-18 defeat of Down in the final.

Kildare's Mattie Dowd was the Christy Ring Cup top scorer with 2-39.

Group A

Table

Round 1

Round 2

Round 3

Round 4

Round 5

Group B

Table

Round 1

Round 2

Round 3

Round 4

Round 5

Relegation Playoffs

Knockout stage

Bracket

Semi-finals

Christy Ring Cup Final

Top scorers

Overall

References

Christy Ring Cup
Christy Ring Cup